Local elections were held in Pasay on May 13, 2019 within the Philippine general election. The voters elected for the elective local posts in the city: the mayor, vice mayor, the congressman, and the councilors, six of them in the two districts of the city.

Background
Mayor Antonino Calixto was on third and final term and is barred for seeking another term. He ran for Congressional seat in the lone district. Her sister, three-termer congresswoman Imelda Calixto-Rubiano, ran for his place. Her opponent was Cesar Joseph "Chet" Cuneta, son of former Mayor Pablo Cuneta and older brother of actress and singer Sharon Cuneta. Other opponents were Fiscal Edward "ET" Togonon, who served as Chief Prosecutor of Pasay, Muntinlupa and Manila for 32 years, Atty. Cherry Christine “Tin” Ching, and Jon Wilfred “JT” Trinidad, Former SK Federation President and son of the late former Mayor Atty. Wenceslao "Peewee" Trinidad.

Vice Mayor Noel “Boyet” Del Rosario ran for second term. His opponents were former First District Councilor Richard M. Advincula, Atty. Jose Allan "Bong" M. Tebelin and Armando Magbanua.

Rep. Imelda Calixto-Rubiano was term-limited, and she switched seats with her brother, Mayor Antonino Calixto. Other candidates were Atty. Elmer Mitra, Efren Alas, Metel Gelbolingo, and Pedro "Pete" Ordiales.

Candidates

Team Calixto

Team Ching (PDDS)

Chetsharon Warriors

Team Togonon

Others

Results
Names written in bold-Italic are the re-elected incumbents while in italic are incumbents lost in elections.

For Representative, Lone District of Pasay 
Mayor Antonino "Tony" Calixto defeated Efren "Choy" Alas, Elmer Mitra, Metel Gelbolingo, and Pedro "Pete" Ordiales.

For Mayor
Rep. Imelda "Emi" Calixto-Rubiano defeated her closest rivals Cesar Joseph "Chet" Cuneta and Edward "ET" Togonon.

For Vice Mayor
Vice Mayor Noel "Boyet" Del Rosario defeated his closest rival, former Councilor Richard Advincula.

For Councilors

First District
Former Councilors Mary Grace Santos and Marlon Pesebre successfully made a city council comeback. Santos replaced her husband, one-termer councilor Consertino "Tino" Santos.  

Marlon Pesebre made a successful city council comeback after he lost in vice-mayoral race in 2016. 

Abraham Albert "Ambet" Alvina successfully replaced his father, outgoing Councilor Alberto Alvina.  

Councilor Jerome Advincula failed to secure his seat for supposedly second term. He was the son of vice-mayoral candidate, former Councilor Richard Advincula. 

Former Councilor Lexter "Lex" Ibay failed to made city council comeback.

|-bgcolor=black
|colspan=25|

Second District
All incumbent councilors was re-elected. 

Former Councilor Noel "Onie" Bayona failed to made city council comeback, placing 7th.

|-bgcolor=black
|colspan=25|

References

2019 Philippine local elections
Elections in Pasay
May 2019 events in the Philippines
2019 elections in Metro Manila